The Towerrining Lake and Moodiarrup Swamps Important Bird Area is a  site comprising a cluster of wetlands on the Blackwood River about  south of Darkan, and  north-west of Kojonup, in the south-west of the Wheatbelt region of Western Australia.

Description
The site consists of the  Towerrining Lake, a highly modified brackish lake, with adjacent brackish swampland to its north-west, unofficially known as Moodiarrup Swamp NW.  It encompasses the Towerrining Nature Reserve.  The lake receives water from the swamp, rainfall and local streams.  It has open water bordered by a fringe of paperbarks. Waterskiing is seasonally popular, with a caravan park, campsite and picnic grounds adjacent to the wetlands.  When flooded, the semi-permanent swamp consists of open water with isolated shrubs and stands of dead trees.  The wetlands have suffered from rising water levels and increased salinity but continue to be important for many waterbirds.  The region has a temperate Mediterranean climate with cool, wet winters and warm, dry summers.

Birds
The site has been identified as an Important Bird Area (IBA) by BirdLife International because it periodically supports over 1% of the world population of blue-billed ducks.  Other waterbirds recorded using the site in relatively large numbers include Australian shelducks, grey teals and hoary-headed grebes.

References

Wetlands of Western Australia
Wheatbelt (Western Australia)
Important Bird Areas of Western Australia